The Chengdu Wing Loong-3 is a Medium-Altitude Long-Endurance (MALE) unmanned aerial combat vehicle (UCAV), developed by the Chengdu Aircraft Industry Group in the People's Republic of China. Intended for use as a multi-purpose platform, including anti-air, anti-submarine warfare (ASW), ground strike, maritime strike, search and rescue, and surveillance and aerial reconnaissance capabilities which can fly a maximum range of 10,000 km at medium altitude with a maximum take-off weight of 6,200 kg. Wing Loong-3 is by far the largest and first air to air capable model of the Wing Loong family

Design and development 
The prototype of the Wing Loong-3  is unveiled for the first time to the public during the Airshow China exhibition, held in Zhuhai from 8–11 November 2022.

The design of the Wing Loong 3 is similar to the Wing Loong 2 consisting of a monoplane slender fuselage and empennage with a prominent V-tail and ventral fin. The landing gear consists of two main wheels under the fuselage and one single wheel under the nose. The electro-optical payload pod, fitted under the forward section of the fuselage, is integrated with daylight and infrared cameras and sensors to collect surveillance and targeting data in both day and low-light / night conditions.

Specifications 

General characteristics

 Crew: None (UAV)
 Length: 12.2 m 
 Wingspan: 24 m 
 Maximum take-off weight: 6,200 kg

Performance

 Range: ≥10,000 km 
 Payload: 2,000 kg (external hardpoints) + 300 kg (internal bay)
 Endurance: ≥40 hours

Armament

 PL-10E air-to-air missile
 BA-7 anti-tank missile
 AG-300/M air-to-ground missiles
 Anti-submarine sonobuoy launcher

See also

References 

Citations

Weapons and ammunition introduced in 2022
Unmanned military aircraft of China